Ranko Moravac (Serbian: Ранко Моравац, born 25 January 1995) is a Serbian football midfielder who plays for FK Jedinstvo Rumenka.

Club career
Moravac came to Slovenia with his father in summer 2010, when he was on a trial with Maribor youth selections. He officially joined Maribor on 1 July 2011. However, being under the age of 18 and foreigner, he could not be registered for the club, thus he was unable to play any official match. He trained with the first team and played a few exhibition games until 25 January 2013, when he turned 18 and was finally registered for the official competitions.

International career
Moravac was capped for Serbia at under-16 level.

Honours
Maribor
Slovenian Championship: 2012–13, 2013–14, 2016–17
Slovenian Cup: 2012–13
Slovenian Supercup: 2013, 2014

Personal life
His younger brother, Ljubomir Moravac, is a former football goalkeeper. On 2 August 2016, Ljubomir was seriously injured in a traffic collision after returning from a training session and had to retire.

References

External links
 NZS profile 
 

1995 births
Living people
Footballers from Novi Sad
Serbian footballers
Association football midfielders
Serbian expatriate footballers
Serbian expatriate sportspeople in Slovenia
Expatriate footballers in Slovenia
FK Vojvodina players
FK ČSK Čelarevo players
NK Maribor players
NK Krško players
NK Fužinar players
Slovenian PrvaLiga players
Slovenian Second League players
Serbia youth international footballers